Bayot may refer to:

People
Robert Bayot
Miguel Bayot
Margaret-Ann Bayot
Adolphe Jean-Baptiste Bayot

Other uses
Bayot language
Bayot, a Cebuano word for effeminate men